The Big River is a tributary of the Meramec River in east-central Missouri. The river rises in western Iron County near the summit of Johnson Mountain just north of Missouri Route 32 and approximately 3.5 miles southeast of the community of Enough. It flows through Washington, Saint Francois, and Jefferson counties. It forms part of the boundary between Jefferson and Saint Francois counties and also part of the boundary between Jefferson and Washington counties. It empties into the Meramec River opposite Eureka where the Meramec forms the border between Jefferson and Saint Louis counties. The river flows through Washington State Park, St. Francois State Park, and the Lead Belt mining district.

The river flows through or near the communities of Belgrade, Irondale, Park Hills, Bonne Terre, Morse Mill, Cedar Hill, and Byrnes Mill.

Tributaries of the Big River include Flat River, Belews Creek, Turkey Creek, Mill Creek, Mineral Fork, Calico Creek, Heads Creek, Terre Bleue Creek, Ditch Creek, and Jones Creek.

Character of the river
This indicates that this river formed on a plain near sea level, which give the river its meandering nature, and then was subsequently uplifted, causing entrenchment.

About  are navigable; however, the remains of five small mill dams makes portage necessary, due to drops of several feet or high turbulence. Otherwise, the river is gentle for canoeing, with a Class I difficulty rating. Public parks are adjacent to most of these dams, and are popular fishing spots. Due to steady infeed of springwater, this river is navigable in all seasons.

Major pollution sources near Park Hills are due to historic mining activities, which including erosion from mine tailings piles and leaking mine dams.

Major gamefish commonly found in the river include largemouth bass, smallmouth bass, spotted bass, rock bass, longear sunfish, bluegill, channel catfish, flathead catfish, and redhorse suckers.

History
The name "Big River" is a translation of the French Grande Rivière.

August is the month with the lowest average flow, while April has the highest average flow.

See also
List of Missouri rivers

References

External links

Big River canoeing information
More Big River canoeing information
Big River flood stage information
A Paddlers Guide to Missouri
Big River Watershed Inventory and Assessment, from the  Rivers of Missouri
Tributaries of the Meramec River
Rivers of Iron County, Missouri
Rivers of Washington County, Missouri
Rivers of St. Francois County, Missouri
Rivers of Jefferson County, Missouri Missouri Department of Conservation